Yinde-Millinou is a town in the Nzérékoré Region of Guinea.

Populated places in the Nzérékoré Region